Ayah Moaataz (born 15 March 1997) is an Egyptian chess player and Woman International Master.

She came shared second (fourth on tiebreak) with 6.5/9 in the Under 16/18 African Youth Championships in South Africa in 2012.

Moaataz played first board for the Egyptian women's team at the 2011 Pan Arab Games, where her team won the bronze medal  and also played board three at the 41st Chess Olympiad in Tromso, scoring 6.5/11.

She came second at the African Women's Chess Championship in 2013 scoring 7/9 and qualified for the Women's World Chess Championship 2014 by winning the Egyptian Women's Championship in Cairo in early 2014.

References

External links
 

1997 births
Living people
Egyptian female chess players
Chess Woman International Masters
Place of birth missing (living people)
21st-century Egyptian women